The University Neighborhood Historic District is roughly bounded by Gervais St., the Southern Railroad Cut, Greene St. and Pickens St. in the University Hill neighborhood of Columbia, South Carolina. The district is significant for its architecture, including Late Victorian, Late 19th And 20th Century Revival styles. It was added to the National Register of Historic Places in 2004.

References

University of South Carolina
National Register of Historic Places in Columbia, South Carolina
Historic districts on the National Register of Historic Places in South Carolina
Buildings and structures in Columbia, South Carolina